Juda Na Hona (previously titled Parwarish) is a 2019 Pakistani television series. It features Shehroz Sabzwari, Mansha Pasha, Alyy Khan, Firdous Jamal, Humera Bano, Maryam Noor, Sonia Nazir, and Tara Mahmood in pivotal roles. The serial began on TV One from 25 February 2019, and airs on Monday.

Plot
The story belongs in between Samaha (Mansha Pasha) who is the daughter of very poor family and Sudais 
(Shehroz Sabzwari) who is the son of very rich family. Both by fate meet and fall in love for each other.

Cast
Shehroz Sabzwari as Sudais
Mansha Pasha as Samaha
Alyy Khan as Sudais Father
Firdous Jamal as Samaha's Father
Humaira Bano as Samaha's Mother
Maryam Noor as Maria
Sonia Nazir as Sajal
Tara Mahmood as Sudais Mother

References

External links 
 

Pakistani drama television series
2019 Pakistani television series debuts
2019 Pakistani television series endings
Urdu-language television shows
TVOne Pakistan